Karthikeyapuram is one of 27 Gram panchayat in Thiruttani town. It is an administrative panchyat for villages under Karthikeyapuram panchayat. The village is located 3 km from Tiruttani and 9 km from Arrakonam

Villages
Villages under Karthikeyapuram panchayat
Karthikeyapuram
P.T Pudhur
Saraswathi nagar
Valliyammapuram

Cities and towns in Tiruvallur district